Xone of Contention is the twenty-third book of the Xanth series by Piers Anthony.

Plot introduction

Dug, the Mundane who had had an adventure in Xanth through the Companions of Xanth computer game, is now happily married to Kim.  His friend Edsel on the other hand is on the rock with his marriage to Pia, Dug's old girlfriend, who wants a divorce.  Edsel, not wanting to lose her strikes a deal with her, they take a two-week vacation in Xanth, switching with Nimby and Chlorine who want to learn about Mundania, and if she doesn't change her mind, he won't fight it.

References

 23
1999 American novels
American fantasy novels
American science fiction novels
1999 science fiction novels
1999 fantasy novels
English-language novels